The Gold Awards is an annual awards show that honours the best performers in the Hindi-language television industry. They were first awarded in 2007. Boroplus was the title sponsor for the first 10 editions after which Kesh King took over.

The awards are presented in various areas of excellence, such as popular programming, including music programmes, news, entertainment programmes, sports, travel, lifestyle and fashion; best television channel in a particular category including news, sports and entertainment; technical awards and popular awards. The event is managed by Vikaas Kalantari, founder of Gold Awards.

History
It is an annual Hindi television award show with many categories, including categories for Indian soap opera. The awards are presented for outstanding achievements, both in popular as well as technical branches such as television software and crafts. Initially the award show represented the best achievements of the year in the opinion of the TV industry. The voting was by industry workers right from the spot boys to actors, directors, writers and producers. Later, however, the voting system changed to an audience vote.

In the year 2007 and 2008, more than 300 TV and film personalities attended the event held in Mauritius and Dubai respectively.

Categories

Popular Awards

 Best Actor in a Leading Role
 Best Actress in a Leading Role
 Best Actor in a Comic Role
 Best Actress in a Comic Role
 Best Actor in a Negative Role
 Best Actress in a Negative Role
 Best Actor in a Supporting Role
 Best Actress in a Supporting Role
 Gold Debut in a Lead Role (Male)
 Gold Debut in a Lead Role (Female)
 Best Child Artiste (Male)
 Best Child Artiste (Female)
 Most Stylish Actor of the Year
 Most Stylish Actress of the Year
 Most Fit Actor of the Year
 Most Fit Actress of the Year
 Gold Best Onscreen Jodi
 Best Fiction Show of the Year

Critics Awards
 Gold Award for Best Actor in a Lead Role (Jury)|Best Actor in a Lead Role (Jury)
 Gold Award for Best Actress in a Lead Role (Jury)|Best Actress in a Lead Role (Jury)

 Best Actor in a Comic Role
 Best Actress in a Comic Role
 Best Actor in a Negative Role
 Best Actress in a Negative Role
 Best Actor in a Supporting Role
 Best Actress in a Supporting Role
 Stellar Performer of the Year (Male)
 Stellar Performer of the Year (Female)
 Boroplus Face of the Year
 Best Anchor
 Best Director
 Best Youth Show of the Year
 Best Comedy Show of the Year
 Best Crime/Thriller Show of the Year
 Best Dance Talent Show of the Year

Special Awards

 Gold Producer's Honor For Completing 1000 episodes
 Hall of Fame
 Scintillating Comeback on Indian Television 
 Most Celebrated Standup Comedian on Indian Television 
 Rising Film Stars from Indian Television 
 Most Consistent TRP Gainer Show of The Year
 OTT Icon Of The Year

See also

 List of Asian television awards

References

External links

Watch Gold Awards on ZEE5

Gold Awards
Indian television awards